Novy Tatysh (Yañı Tatış) is a rural locality (a village) in Novokainlykovsky Selsoviet, Krasnokamsky District, Bashkortostan, Russia. The population was 133 as of 2010. There are 2 streets.

Geography 
Novy Tatysh is located 70 km south of Nikolo-Beryozovka (the district's administrative centre) by road. Burnyush is the nearest rural locality.

References 

Rural localities in Krasnokamsky District